The Deir ez-Zor Governorate campaign of the Syrian civil war consists of several battles and offensives fought across the governorate of Syria:
 Deir ez-Zor clashes (2011–2014)
 2012 Deir ez-Zor bombing
 Hatla massacre
 Battle of Deir ez-Zor (2014–2017)
 Deir ez-Zor offensive (April–July 2014)
 Deir ez-Zor offensive (December 2014) 
 Deir ez-Zor offensive (2016)
 September 2016 Deir ez-Zor air raid
 Deir ez-Zor offensive (January–February 2017)
 Central Syria campaign (2017)
 2017 Deir ez-Zor missile strike
 Deir ez-Zor offensive (September–November 2017)
 2016 Abu Kamal offensive
 Raqqa campaign (2016–2017) (the SDF first entered Deir ez-Zor Governorate)
 Syrian Desert campaign (December 2016–April 2017)
 Deir ez-Zor campaign (2017–2019)
 Battle of Khasham
 Battle of Hajin
 Battle of Baghuz Fawqani
 Eastern Syria campaign (September–December 2017)
 2017 Euphrates Crossing offensive
 2017 Mayadin offensive
 2017 Abu Kamal offensive
 Deir ez-Zor Governorate clashes (April 2018)
 Deir ez-Zor offensive (May–June 2018)
 Iranian strike on Hajin

Order of battle

Pro-government forces 
 Syrian government
  Syrian Armed Forces
  Syrian Army
 1st Armoured Division
 3rd Armoured Division
 Qalamoun Shield Forces
 4th Armoured Division
 38th Brigade
 5th Corps
 ISIS Hunters
 17th Division
 18th Armoured Division
137th Brigade
 Republican Guard
104th Brigade
 800th Regiment
 Tiger Forces
  Syrian Air Force
  National Defence Forces
  Baqir Brigade
 Lions of Hussein
 Military Intelligence Directorate
 Military Security Shield Forces
 Forces of the Fighters of the Tribes
 Hezbollah
 Lebanese Hezbollah
 Radwan Force
 Syrian Hezbollah
 Imam Mahdi Scouts from Nubl
 Hezbollah Rocket Division
 (since 2015)
  Russian Armed Forces
 
 29th Army
 200th Artillery Brigade
 Special Operations Forces
 Russian Aerospace Forces
 
 
 Wagner Group
 5 Storm unit
 (since 2013)
 Iranian Armed Forces
  Islamic Revolutionary Guard Corps
 Aerospace Force of the Islamic Revolutionary Guard Corps
 Quds Force
 PMF-affiliated militias
 Kata'ib al-Imam Ali
 Harakat Hezbollah al-Nujaba
 12th Mechanized Brigade
 Kata'ib Sayyid al-Shuhada
 Kata'ib Hezbollah
 Asa'ib Ahl al-Haq
 Kafeel Zaynab Brigade
 (since 2017, against ISIS only)
  Iraqi Air Force
Other armed groups:
 Shabiha (2011–12, merged into NDF)
  Liwa Abu al-Fadhal al-Abbas (2011–14, rebel claim)
 Foreign Shia groups
 Liwa Fatemiyoun
 Liwa Zainebiyoun
  Syrian Resistance
 Falcons of the Jazira and Euphrates
  Palestinian groups
  Al-Quds Brigade
 Galilee Forces
  Fatah al-Intifada
 Free Palestine Movement
  Sootoro
 Allied local tribes
 Al-Shaitat
 Al-Baggara

SDF forces and allies 
 (since 2016)
  Syrian Democratic Forces
  People's Protection Units (YPG)
 Anti-Terror Units
  YPG International 
  Women's Protection Units (YPJ)
  Deir ez-Zor Military Council
 Gathering of al-Baggara Youth
 Khabat al-Sha'iti Battalion
 Hajin battalion
  Al-Sanadid Forces
  Manbij Military Council
  Manbij Revolutionaries Battalion
 Martyr Abdo Dushka Regiment
  Army of Revolutionaries
 Kurdish Front
  Northern Democratic Brigade
  Syriac Military Council (MFS)
 Special Forces unit
  Nattoreh
 Federal security forces
 Self Defence Forces (HXP)
 Asayish
 International Freedom Battalion (IFB)
  Communist Party of Turkey/Marxist–Leninist (TKP/ML)
  Liberation Army of the Workers and Peasants of Turkey (TİKKO)
Foreign support:
  CJTF–OIR
 
 United States Armed Forces
  United States Army
 Delta Force
  United States Air Force
  United States special operations forces
  United States Marine Corps
 
 British Armed Forces
  Royal Air Force
 
 Special Air Service 
 
  French Air Force
  French Army
 
 French SOF
 
 
  (2016)
 
  (2016)
 
  (minor cross border support since 2018, against ISIS only)
 Popular Mobilization Forces
  (air support since 2018, against ISIS only)

Pro-ISIS forces 
 (IS)
 Military of ISIS
 Wilayat al-Khayr (until 2018)
 Wilayat al-Sham (since 2018)
 al-Barakah district (2016–2019)
 al-Khayr district (2018–19)
 al-Furat district (2018–19)

References 



Deir ez-Zor Governorate in the Syrian civil war
Military operations of the Syrian civil war